Fodinoidea staudingeri is a moth of the family Erebidae. It was described by Max Saalmüller in 1884. It is found on Madagascar.

Subspecies
Fodinoidea staudingeri staudingeri
Fodinoidea staudingeri laeta Toulgoët, 1957

References

 

Spilosomina
Moths described in 1884